The Delfinen-class submarines were the first class of submarines constructed for the Royal Danish Navy following World War II. They were designed and built within Denmark, with first three boats of the class financed by Denmark. The fourth was financed by the United States (where it was known as SS-554) under the Cost Share program. Constructed between 1956 and 1963, the class comprising four submarines (and ) entered service in 1961 and the last taken out of service in 1990. Replaced by the Norwegian , three of them were scrapped while a fourth was converted into a museum ship and remains on display at the Aalborg Maritime Museum.

Description
The submarines were propelled by two shafts powered by two B&W  diesel engines and two BBC  electric motors. The submarines were equipped with passive and active sonar and a schnorkel. The Delfinen class were armed with four  torpedo tubes located in the bow. They had a complement of 33.

Ships

Construction and service
Following World War II, the Royal Danish Navy which had lost the majority of its fleet during the German invasion, was restocked with ex-British Royal Navy submarines on loan and salvaged Danish submarines that had been scuttled during the war. Denmark joined NATO and was assigned the defence of the Baltic Sea which led to an emphasis on submarines. The Delfinen class marked the Royal Danish Navy's first new submarines in the post war era. Designed by the Danish and constructed at the Naval Shipyard in Copenhagen, the first three vessels in the class were paid for the Danish and were constructed between 1956 and 1961. The fourth submarine of the class, Springeren, was financed by the United States and known as SS-554.

The class remained in service until the beginning of the 1980s, when the Royal Danish Navy intended to replace them with former Norwegian s in 1986. Only three Kobben-class units were acquired due to a lack of funds and Springeren remained in service until 1990. Springeren is preserved as a museum ship at the Naval Museum in Aalborg.

Notes

Citations

References
 
 
 

Submarine classes
 
Ships built in Denmark